The United Nations Population Fund designated 12 October 1999, as the approximate day on which world population reached six billion following the birth of Adnan Mević, the first son of Fatima Helać and Jasminko Mević, in Sarajevo, Bosnia and Herzegovina. It was officially designated The Day of Six Billion.

Demographers do not universally accept this date as being exact. In fact there has been subsequent research which places the day of six billion to be nearer to 18 or 19 June 1999.

Adnan Mević, born in Sarajevo, Bosnia-Herzegovina, 12 October 1999, was chosen by the United Nations as the symbolic 6 billionth concurrently alive person on Earth.  He is the first son of Fatima Mević, and her husband Jasminko Mević. The child was born weighing 3.5 kilograms in the Koševo hospital in the capital of Bosnia and Herzegovina. He had been proclaimed by the United Nations Population Fund and welcomed by the secretary-general of the United Nations, Kofi Annan, as the six billionth baby. He was born on the designated day two minutes after midnight.

See also 
World population
Day of Seven Billion

References 

Population statistics
October 1999 events
United Nations days
October observances
United Nations Population Fund